Phil Woods/Lew Tabackin  is an album by saxophonists Phil Woods and Lew Tabackin which was recorded in 1980 for the Omnisound label and rereleased on Evidence.

Reception

AllMusic awarded the album 4½ stars stating "Everything on this recording works". The Penguin Guide to Jazz selected this album as part of its suggested Core Collection.

Track listing
All compositions by Phil Woods except where noted.
 "Limehouse Blues" (Philip Braham, Douglas Furber) - 8:04
 "Sweet and Lovely" (Gus Arnheim, Jules LeMare, Harry Tobias) - 10:54
 "Lew Blew" - 5:36
 "Petite Chanson" - 9:39   
 "Theme of No Repeat" (Tadd Dameron) - 7:17
 "Sittin' Here" - 8:47
 "Theme of No Repeat" [Alternate Take] (Dameron) - 8:09 Bonus track on CD reissue

Personnel 
Phil Woods - alto saxophone
Lew Tabackin - tenor saxophone 
Jimmy Rowles - piano
Michael Moore - bass
Bill Goodwin - drums

References 

1981 albums
Phil Woods albums
Lew Tabackin albums
Evidence Music albums
Collaborative albums